The 2014 OFC Champions League Final was the final of the 2013–14 OFC Champions League, the 13th edition of the Oceania Cup, Oceania's premier club football tournament organized by the Oceania Football Confederation (OFC), and the 8th season under the current OFC Champions League name.

The final was contested in two-legged home-and-away format between Amicale of Vanuatu and Auckland City of New Zealand. The first leg was hosted by Amicale at Port Vila Municipal Stadium in Port Vila on 10 May 2014, while the second leg was hosted by Auckland City at Kiwitea Street in Auckland on 18 May 2014. The winner earned the right to represent the OFC at the 2014 FIFA Club World Cup, entering at the qualifying play-off round. Both finalists also earned invitations to participate in the 2014 OFC President's Cup.

The first leg ended in a 1–1 draw, and Auckland City won the second leg 2–1, giving them a record-setting sixth OFC club title.

Background
Amicale had played in one previous OFC Champions League final, where they lost to Auckland City 6–1 on aggregate in 2011. Auckland City were the three-time defending champions and had played in five previous finals, winning all of them in 2006, 2009, 2011, 2012, and 2013.

The two teams were drawn into Group B of this season's group stage with Nadi of Fiji and Dragon of Tahiti. Both Amicale and Auckland City won their first two matches, and Amicale won 1–0 in the final match to finish top of the group stage, while Auckland City also advanced to the semi-finals as the best runner-up. In the semi-finals, Amicale eliminated Ba of Fiji, while Auckland City eliminated Pirae of Tahiti.

Road to final

Note: In all results below, the score of the finalist is given first.

Rules
The final was played on a home-and-away two-legged basis. The away goals rule, extra time and penalty shoot-out were used to decide the winner if necessary.

Matches

First leg

Second leg

References

External links

2014
1 Final
2013–14 in New Zealand association football